Joseph Marie, comte de Maistre (1 April 1753 – 26 February 1821) was a Savoyard philosopher, writer, lawyer, and diplomat who advocated social hierarchy and monarchy in the period immediately following the French Revolution. Despite his close personal and intellectual ties with France, Maistre was throughout his life a subject of the Kingdom of Sardinia, which he served as a member of the Savoy Senate (1787–1792), ambassador to Russia (1803–1817), and minister of state to the court in Turin (1817–1821).

A key figure of the Counter-Enlightenment and a precursor of Romanticism, Maistre regarded monarchy both as a divinely sanctioned institution and as the only stable form of government. He called for the restoration of the House of Bourbon to the throne of France and for the ultimate authority of the Pope in temporal matters. Maistre argued that the rationalist rejection of Christianity was directly responsible for the disorder and bloodshed which followed the French Revolution of 1789.

Biography 
Maistre was born in 1753 at Chambéry, Duchy of Savoy, at that time part of the Kingdom of Piedmont-Sardinia which was ruled by the House of Savoy. His family was of French and Italian origin. His grandfather André (Andrea) Maistre, whose parents Francesco and Margarita Maistre (née Dalmassi) originated in the County of Nice, had been a draper and councilman in Nice (then under the rule of the House of Savoy) and his father François-Xavier, who moved to Chambéry in 1740, became a magistrate and senator, eventually receiving the title of count from the King of Piedmont-Sardinia. His mother's family, whose surname was Desmotz, were from Rumilly. His younger brother Xavier, who became an army officer, was a popular writer of fiction.

Maistre was probably educated by the Jesuits. After the Revolution, he became an ardent defender of the Jesuits, increasingly associating the spirit of the Revolution with the Jesuits' traditional enemies, the Jansenists. After completing his training in the law at the University of Turin in 1774, he followed in his father's footsteps by becoming a Senator in 1787.

A member of the progressive Scottish Rite Masonic lodge at Chambéry from 1774 to 1790, Maistre originally favoured political reform in France, supporting the efforts of the magistrates in the Parlements to force King Louis XVI to convene the Estates General. As a landowner in France, Maistre was eligible to join that body and there is some evidence that he contemplated that possibility. Maistre was alarmed by the decision of the Estates-General to combine aristocracy, clergy and commoners into a single legislative body which became the National Constituent Assembly. After the passing of the August Decrees on 4 August 1789, he decisively turned against the course of political events in France.

Maistre fled Chambéry when it was taken by a French revolutionary army in 1792, but he was unable to find a position in the royal court in Turin and returned the following year. Deciding that he could not support the French-controlled regime, Maistre departed again, this time for Lausanne, Switzerland, where he discussed politics and theology at the salon of Madame de Staël, and began his career as a counter-revolutionary writer, with works such as Lettres d'un Royaliste Savoisien ("Letters from a Savoyard Royalist", 1793), Discours à Mme. la Marquise Costa de Beauregard, sur la Vie et la Mort de son Fils ("Discourse to the Marchioness Costa de Beauregard, on the Life and Death of her Son", 1794) and Cinq paradoxes à la Marquise de Nav... ("Five Paradoxes for the Marchioness of Nav...", 1795).

From Lausanne, Maistre went to Venice and then to Cagliari, where the King of Piedmont-Sardinia held the court and the government of the kingdom after French armies took Turin in 1798. Maistre's relations with the court at Cagliari were not always easy. In 1802, he was sent to Saint Petersburg in Russia as ambassador to Tsar Alexander I. His diplomatic responsibilities were few and he became a well-loved fixture in aristocratic and wealthy merchant circles, converting some of his friends to Roman Catholicism and writing his most influential works on political philosophy.

Maistre's observations on Russian life, contained in his diplomatic memoirs and in his personal correspondence, were among Leo Tolstoy's sources for his novel War and Peace. After the defeat of Napoleon and the restoration of the House of Savoy's dominion over Piedmont and Savoy under the terms of the Congress of Vienna, Maistre returned in 1817 to Turin and served there as magistrate and minister of state until his death. He died on 26 February 1821 and is buried in the Jesuit Church of the Holy Martyrs (Chiesa dei Santi Martiri).

Philosophy

Politics 

In Considérations sur la France ("Considerations on France", 1797), Maistre claimed that France has a divine mission as the principal instrument of good and evil on Earth. He interpreted the Revolution of 1789 as a providential event in which the monarchy, the aristocracy and the Ancien Régime in general, instead of directing the influence of French civilization to the benefit of mankind, had promoted the atheistic doctrines of the 18th-century philosophers. He claimed that the crimes of the Reign of Terror were the logical consequence of Enlightenment thought as well as its divinely-decreed punishment.

In his short book Essai sur le Principe Générateur des Constitutions Politiques et des Autres Institutions Humaines ("Essay on the Generative Principle of Political Constitutions and other Human Institutions", 1809), Maistre argued that constitutions are not the product of human reason, but rather come from God, who slowly brings them to maturity.

What was novel in Maistre's writings was not his enthusiastic defense of monarchical and religious authority per se, but rather his arguments concerning the practical need for ultimate authority to lie with an individual capable of decisive action as well as his analysis of the social foundations of that authority's legitimacy. In his own words which he addressed to a group of aristocratic French émigrés, "You ought to know how to be royalists. Before, this was an instinct, but today it is a science. You must love the sovereign as you love order, with all the forces of intelligence." Maistre's analysis of the problem of authority and its legitimacy foreshadows some of the concerns of early sociologists such as Auguste Comte and Henri de Saint-Simon.

Religion 
After the appearance in 1816 of his French translation of Plutarch's treatise On the Delay of Divine Justice in the Punishment of the Guilty, Maistre published Du Pape ("On the Pope") in 1819, the most complete exposition of his religious conception of authority. According to Maistre, any attempt to justify government on rational grounds will only lead to unresolvable arguments about the legitimacy and expediency of any existing government and that this in turn will lead to violence and chaos. As a result, Maistre argued that the legitimacy of government must be based on compelling, but non-rational grounds which its subjects must not be allowed to question. Maistre went on to argue that authority in politics should derive from religion and that in Europe this religious authority must ultimately lie with the Pope.

Ethics 
In addition to his voluminous correspondence, Maistre left two books that were published posthumously. Soirées de St. Pétersbourg ("St Petersburg Dialogues", 1821) is a theodicy in the form of a Platonic dialogue in which Maistre argues that evil exists because of its place in the divine plan, according to which the blood sacrifice of innocents returns men to God via the expiation of the sins of the guilty. Maistre sees this as a law of human history as unquestionable as it is mysterious.

Science 
Examen de la Philosophie de Bacon, ("An Examination of the Philosophy of Bacon", 1836) is a critique of the thought of Francis Bacon, whom Maistre considers to be the fountainhead of the destructive Enlightened thought. Maistre also argued, romantically, that genius plays a pivotal role in great scientific discoveries, as demonstrated by inspired intellects such as Johannes Kepler, Galileo Galilei and Isaac Newton, contrary to Bacon's theory about conforming to a mechanistic method.

Legacy and reputation

Politics  
Together with the Anglo-Irish statesman and philosopher Edmund Burke, Maistre is commonly regarded as one of the founders of European conservatism. Maistre exerted a powerful influence on the Spanish political thinker Juan Donoso Cortés and later on the French monarchist Charles Maurras and his monarchist political movement Action Française.

However, according to Carolina Armenteros, who has written four books about Maistre, his writings influenced not only conservative political thinkers, but also the utopian socialists. Early sociologists such as Auguste Comte and Henri de Saint-Simon explicitly acknowledged the influence of Maistre on their own thinking about the sources of social cohesion and political authority.

Liberal critic Émile Faguet described Maistre as "a fierce absolutist, a furious theocrat, an intransigent legitimist, apostle of a monstrous trinity composed of pope, king and hangman, always and everywhere the champion of the hardest, narrowest and most inflexible dogmatism, a dark figure out of the Middle Ages, part learned doctor, part inquisitor, part executioner".

Literature 
Maistre's skills as a writer and polemicist ensured that he continues to be read. Matthew Arnold, an influential 19th-century critic, wrote as follows while comparing Maistre's style with that of his Irish counterpart Edmund Burke:

"Joseph de Maistre is another of those men whose word, like that of Burke, has vitality. In imaginative power he is altogether inferior to Burke. On the other hand his thought moves in closer order than Burke's, more rapidly, more directly; he has fewer superfluities. Burke is a great writer, but Joseph de Maistre's use of the French language is more powerful, more thoroughly satisfactory, than Burke's use of the English. It is masterly; it shows us to perfection of what that admirable instrument, the French language, is capable."

The Catholic Encyclopedia of 1910 describes his writing style as "strong, lively, picturesque" and states that his "animation and good humour temper his dogmatic tone". George Saintsbury called him "unquestionably one of the greatest thinkers and writers of the eighteenth century".  Although a political opponent, Alphonse de Lamartine admired the splendour of his prose, stating:

Maistre is also associated with the Counter-Enlightenment movement Romanticism and is often referred to as a Romantic. Amongst those who admired him was Charles Baudelaire – the most famous Romantic poet in France – who described himself a disciple of the Savoyard counter-revolutionary, claiming that Maistre had taught him how to think.

Works 

 Nobilis Ioseph Maistre Camberiensis ad i.u. lauream anno 1772. die 29. Aprilis hora 5. pomeridiana  (Turin, 1772) – Joseph de Maistre's decree thesis, kept in the National Library of the University of Turin.
 Éloge de Victor-Amédée III (Chambéry, 1775)
 Lettres d'un royaliste savoisien à ses compatriotes (1793)
 Étude sur la souveraineté (1794)
 De l'État de nature, ou Examen d'un écrit de Jean-Jacques Rousseau (1795)
 Considérations sur la France (London [Basel], 1796)
 Intorno allo stato del Piemonte rispetto alla carta moneta (Turn, Aosta, Venice, 1797–1799)
 Essai sur le Principe Générateur des Constitutions Politiques, 1814, [1st. Pub. 1809]
 Du Pape, Tome Second, 1819.
 De l'Église Gallicane, édit. Rodolphe de Maistre, 1821.
 Les Soirées de Saint-Pétersbourg ou Entretiens sur le Gouvernement Temporel de la Providence, Tome Second, édit. Rodolphe de Maistre, 1821.
 Lettres à un Gentilhomme Russe sur l'Inquisition Espagnole, édit. Rodolphe de Maistre, 1822.
 Examen de la Philosophie de Bacon, ou: l'on Traite Différentes Questions de Philosophie Rationnelle, Tome Second, édit. Rodolphe de Maistre, 1836.
 Lettres et Opuscules Inédits du Comte Joseph de Maistre, Tome Second, édit. Rodolphe de Maistre, Paris, 1853.
 Mémoires Politiques et Correspondance Diplomatique, édit. Albert Blanc, Paris, 1859.

 English translations
 Memoir on the Union of Savoy and Switzerland, 1795.
 Essay on the Generative Principle of Political Constitutions, 1847.
 The Pope: Considered in His Relations with the Church, Temporal Sovereignties, Separated Churches and the Cause of Civilization, 1850.
 Letters on the Spanish Inquisition, 1838.
 In Menczer, Béla, 1962. Catholic Political Thought, 1789–1848, University of Notre Dame Press.
 "Human and Divine Nomenclature", pp. 61–66.
 "War, Peace, and Social Order", pp. 66–69.
 "On Sophistry and Tyranny", pp. 69–71.
 "Russia and the Christian West", pp. 72–76.
 Lively, Jack. ed. The Works of Joseph de Maistre, Macmillan, 1965.
  Richard Lebrun, ed. Works of Joseph de Maistre:
 The Pope, Howard Fertig, 1975
 St. Petersburg Dialogues, McGill-Queen's University Press, 1993
 Considerations on France, McGill-Queen's University Press, 1974 and Cambridge University Press, 1994
 Against Rousseau: "On the State of Nature" and "On the Sovereignty of the People", McGill-Queen's University Press, 1996
 Examination of the Philosophy of Bacon, McGill-Queen's University Press, 1998
 Blum, Christopher Olaf (editor and translator). Critics of the Enlightenment, ISI Books, 2004
 1798, "Reflections on Protestantism in its Relations to Sovereignty", pp. 133–56.
 1819, "On the Pope", pp. 157–96.
 Lively, Jack. ed. The Generative Principle of Political Constitutions: Studies on Sovereignty, Religion, and Enlightenment, Transaction Publishers, 2011
In Blum, Christopher O., editor and translator. Critics of the Enlightenment, Cluny Media, 2020
1797, "Considerations on France" (excerpt of first two sections), pp. 75–90.
1819, "On the Pope", pp. 91–100.

 Collected Works in English
 Major Works, Volume I, Imperium Press, 2021.

See also 
 Louis Gabriel Ambroise de Bonald
 François-René de Chateaubriand
 German Romanticism

Notes

References

Sources 

 Armenteros, Carolina (2007). "From Human Nature to Normal Humanity: Joseph de Maistre, Rousseau, and the Origins of Moral Statistics," Journal of the History of Ideas, Vol. 68, No. 1, pp. 107–30.
 Armenteros, Carolina (2007). "Parabolas and the Fate of Nations: Early Conservative Historicism in Joseph de Maistre's De la Souveraineté du Peuple," History of Political Thought, Vol. 28, No. 2, pp. 230–52.
 Armenteros, Carolina et al. (2010). The New Enfant du Siècle: Joseph de Maistre as a Writer, St. Andrews Studies in French History and Culture. 
  Armenteros, Carolina (2011). The French Idea of History: Joseph de Maistre and his Heirs, 1794–1854. Ithaca, NY and London: Cornell University Press 
 Armenteros, Carolina and Richard Lebrun (2011). Joseph de Maistre and his European Readers: From Friedrich von Gentz to Isaiah Berlin. Leiden and Boston: Brill.
 Armenteros, Carolina and Richard Lebrun (2011). Joseph de Maistre and the Legacy of Enlightenment. Oxford: The Voltaire Foundation.
 Austern, Donald M. (1974). The Political Theories of Edmund Burke and Joseph de Maistre as Representative of the Schools of Conservative Libertarianism and Conservative Authoritarianism. Amherst: Boston College Doctoral Thesis.
 Barbey D'Aurevilly, Jules (1889). "Joseph de Maistre". In: Les Prophètes du Passé. Paris: Calmann Lévy, pp. 50–69.
 Barthelet, Philippe (2005). Joseph de Maistre: Les Dossiers H. Geneva: L'Age d'Homme.
 Blamires, Cyprian P. (1985). Three Critiques of the French Revolution: Maistre, Bonald and Saint-Simon. Oxford: Oxford University Doctoral Thesis.
 Bradley, Owen (1999). A Modern Maistre: The Social and Political Thought of Joseph de Maistre. Lincoln and London: University of Nebraska Press.
 Brandes, Georg (1903). "Joseph de Maistre." In: Main Currents in Nineteenth Century Literature, Vol. 3. The Reaction in France. New York: The Macmillan Company, pp. 87–112
 
 Camcastle, Cara (2005). The More Moderate Side of Joseph de Maistre. Ottawa: McGill-Queen's University Press.
 Caponigri, A.R. (1942). Some Aspects of the Philosophy of Joseph de Maistre. PhD Thesis, University of Chicago.
 Croce, Benedetto (1922). "Il Duca di Serra-Capriola e Giuseppe de Maistre". In: Archivio Storico per le Province Napoletane, Vol. XLVII, pp. 313–335.
 Edwards, David W. (1977). "Count Joseph de Maistre and Russian Educational Policy, 1803-1828", Slavic Review, Vol. 36, pp. 54–75.
 Eichrodt, Joan B. (1968). Orthodoxy, Autocracy, Nationality, and Joseph de Maistre. New York: Columbia University Master's Thesis.
 Faust, A.J. (1882). "Count Joseph de Maistre," The American Catholic Quarterly Review, Vol. VII, pp. 17–41.
 Fisichella, Domenico (1963). Giusnaturalismo e Teoria della Sovranità in Joseph de Maistre. Messina: Firenze (Rep. in Politica e Mutamento Sociale. Lungro di Cosenza: Costantino Marco Editore, 2002, pp. 191–243 .)
 Fisichella, Domenico (1993). Il Pensiero Politico di Joseph de Maistre. Roma-Bari: Laterza .
 Fisichella, Domenico (2005). Joseph de Maistre, Pensatore Europeo. Roma-Bari: Laterza .
 Garrard, Graeme (1995). Maistre, Judge of Jean-Jacques. An Examination of the Relationship between Jean-Jacques Rousseau, Joseph de Maistre, and the French Enlightenment. Oxford: Oxford University Doctoral Thesis.
 
 Gianturco, Elio (1937). Joseph de Maistre and Giambattista Vico (Italian Roots of the Maistre's Political Culture). New York: Columbia University.
 Gianturco, Elio (1936). "Juridical Culture and Politico-historical Judgement in Joseph de Maistre", Roman Revue, Vol. 27, pp. 254–262.
 Glaudes, Pierre (1997). Joseph de Maistre et Les figures de l'Histoire: Trois Essais sur un Précurseur du Romantisme Français. In: Cahiers Romantiques. Saint Genouph: Librairie Nizet.
 Godechot, Jacques (1982). The Counter-Revolution, Princeton University Press.
 
 Lebrun, Richard A. (ed., 1988). Maistre Studies, Lanham, MD: University Press of America.
 Lebrun, Richard A. (2001). Joseph de Maistre's Life, Thought and Influence: Selected Studies. Ottawa: McGill-Queen's University Press.
 
 Legittimo, Gianfranco (1963). Sociologi Cattolici Italiani: De Maistre, Taparelli, Toniolo. Roma: Il Quadrato.
 Maistre, Rodolphe de, Hexis d'un soir ou de la prénotion d'un retour de l'Esprit dans la science, La Compagnie Littéraire, 2016, 154p. [1]
 Mandoul, Jean (1900). Un Homme d'État Italien: Joseph de Maistre et la Politique de la Maison de Savoie. Paris: Alcan.
 Mazlish, Bruce (1955). Burke, Bonald and de Maistre. A Study in Conservatism. New York: Columbia University Doctoral Thesis.
 McMahon, Darrin M. (2002). Enemies of the Enlightenment: The French Counter-Enlightenment and the Making of Modernity. Oxford University Press.
 Menczer, Béla (1962). "Joseph de Maistre." In: Catholic Political Thought, 1789–1848. University of Notre Dame Press, pp. 59–61.
 Monteton, Charles Philippe Dijon de (2007). Die Entzauberung des Gesellschaftsvertrags. Ein Vergleich der Anti-Sozial-Kontrakts-Theorien von Carl Ludwig von Haller und Joseph Graf de Maistre im Kontext der politischen Ideengeschichte. Frankfurt am Main et al. .
 Morley, John (1909). "Joseph de Maistre." In: Critical Miscellanies. London: Macmillan & Co., pp. 257–338.
 Muret, Charlotte Touzalin (1933). French Royalist Doctrines since the Revolution. New York: Columbia University Press.
 Pranchère, Jean-Yves (1992). Qu'est-ce que la Royauté? Joseph de Maistre. Paris: Vrin.
 Pranchère, Jean-Yves (2005). L'Autorité contre les Lumières: la Philosophie de Joseph de Maistre. Geneva: Droz.
 Sacré-Cœur Mercier, Lucille du (1953). The Historical Thought of the Comte Joseph de Maistre. Washington: Catholic University of America Thesis.
 Siedentop, Larry Alan (1966). The Limits of Enlightenment. A Study of Conservative Political Thought in Early Nineteenth-Century France with Special Reference to Maine de Biran and Joseph de Maistre. Oxford: Oxford University Doctoral Thesis.
 Thorup, Mikkel (2005). "'A World Without Substance': Carl Schmitt and the Counter-Enlightenment," Distinktion: Scandinavian Journal of Social Theory, Vol. 6, No. 1, pp. 19–39.
 Thurston, Benjamin (2001). Joseph de Maistre. Logos and Logomachy. Oxford: Brasenose College-Oxford University Doctoral Thesis.
 Vermale, François (1921), Notes sur Joseph de Maistre Inconnu. Chambéry: Perrin, M. Dardel Successeur.

External links 

 
 
 Works by Joseph de Maistre at Europeana
 Works by Joseph de Maistre at Hathi Trust
 The Joseph de Maistre Homepage at the University of Cambridge
 Works of Joseph de Maistre in English Translation
 Britannica Com: Joseph de Maistre
 
 The Super-Enlightenment: Joseph de Maistre

1753 births
1821 deaths
18th-century French writers
18th-century Italian writers
18th-century Italian male writers
18th-century philosophers
19th-century French writers
19th-century Italian writers
19th-century philosophers
Ambassadors of Italy to Russia
Conservatism in France
Conservatism in Italy
Critics of atheism
Reactionary
Christian humanists
French counter-revolutionaries
French monarchists
French medievalists
French philosophers
18th-century French philosophers
French political philosophers
French Ultra-royalists
Italian counter-revolutionaries
Italian monarchists
Italian medievalists
Italian philosophers
Italian political philosophers
Italian writers in French
French people of Italian descent
Italian people of French descent
Knights of the Order of Saints Maurice and Lazarus
Writers from Chambéry
18th-century people from Savoy
Catholic philosophers
Roman Catholic writers
Savoyard counter-revolutionaries
French Freemasons
Italian Freemasons
French male writers
Virtue ethicists
Ambassadors of the Kingdom of Sardinia
19th-century Italian male writers
University of Turin alumni